B-cell CLL/lymphoma 7 protein family member A is a protein that in humans is encoded by the BCL7A gene.

Function

This gene is directly involved, with Myc and IgH, in a three-way gene translocation in a Burkitt lymphoma cell line. As a result of the gene translocation, the N-terminal region of the gene product is disrupted, which is thought to be related to the pathogenesis of a subset of high-grade B cell non-Hodgkin lymphoma. The N-terminal segment involved in the translocation includes the region that shares a strong sequence similarity with those of BCL7B and BCL7C. Two transcript variants encoding different isoforms have been found for this gene.

See also
 B-cell lymphoma

References

Further reading